This is a list of  ministers of the Armed Forces of the Republic of Senegal :

Key 
Political PartiesOther factions

References
 

Lists of government ministers of Senegal